Burleigh Drummond (born September 25, 1951) is an American drummer, percussionist, producer, songwriter, and singer. He is a founding member and the only drummer/percussionist for the five-time Grammy Award nominated band Ambrosia. He currently performs onstage in the band with his fellow member and wife Mary Harris, and the couple are also both active members of Bill Champlin’s Wunderground and their own band ‘Tin Drum’.

Childhood 
A self-described "Army brat," Drummond's parents were in the U.S. Army, with his father a full colonel and his mother an army nurse. The family moved often and ended up being stationed in Ankara, Turkey where as a child Drummond had an experience he found transformative: he watched and listened as artisans hammered out a large copper plate, not unlike a cymbal, "spinning and hammering in sublime synchronicity." From an early age Drummond realized he would be involved in the percussive arts.

Career 
After playing in various bands, Drummond signed up with a musicians contact service "for $5" and within a week all three members of what would become the band Ambrosia came by his residence and formed the group "before we ever played a note." Drummond has described Ambrosia compositionally as "Joe Puerta and David Pack were like our Lennon and McCartney and I was kind of the George Harrison!"

Drummond recorded on every Ambrosia record from 1970 to the present, and toured internationally with the band throughout its history to date.

Drummond and his wife, Mary Harris, formed the band Tin Drum in the 1990s, and have released 3 albums. Harris and Drummond, who married in 1983, perform musically together onstage with Ambrosia, Tin Drum, and since 2018 in Bill Champlin’s Wunderground.

References

External links 
 Burleigh Drummond, Mary Harris, guest Luis Conte and Tin Drum perform "Real World"
 Ambrosia – Official Website
 Mary Harris and Burleigh Drummond interviewed by Gonzo Today in 2017.

Ambrosia (band) members
1951 births
Living people